Võnnu may refer to several places:

Võnnu is Estonian name for Latvian town Cēsis
Võnnu Parish, municipality in Tartu County, Estonia
Võnnu, small borough in Võnnu Parish, Tartu County, Estonia
Võnnu, Lääne County, village in Ridala Parish, Lääne County